Asperger syndrome is an autism spectrum disorder, a neurobiological syndrome affecting social and communication skills, named after its discoverer Hans Asperger.  

Asperger or Asperger's may also refer to:
 Hans Asperger (1906–1980), Austrian pediatrician after whom Asperger syndrome, a type of autism spectrum disorder, is named
 Asperger's Are Us,  the first comedy troupe formed by people with Asperger syndrome
 Asperger's Society of Ontario

See also
 Asperg, a town in Baden-Württemberg, Germany
 Asperges, a Christian rite of sprinkling holy water
 Aspergillum, a liturgical implement used to sprinkle holy water
 "Asperges me", a Latin antiphon said or sung at the Asperges
 Aspergillus, a genus of several hundred mold species
 Cynthia Ashperger
 High-functioning autism and Asperger's editors, A Wikipedia essay about editors with Asperger's syndrome.